= B-T oil field =

Black Sea oil field

B-T
- Country: Romania
- Region: Black Sea
- Block: Midia
- Offshore/onshore: offshore
- Operator: Sterling Resources

Field history
- Discovery: 2010
- Start of development: 2014
- Start of production: 2018

Production
- Current production of oil: 1,000 barrels per day (~50,000 t/a)
- Estimated oil in place: 2.8 million tonnes (~ 3×10^{6} m^{3} or 20 million bbl)

The B-T oil field is an oil field located on the continental shelf of the Black Sea. It was discovered in 2010 and developed by Sterling Resources. It will begin production in 2018 and will produce oil. The total proven reserves of the B-T oil field are around 20 million barrels (2.8 million tonnes), and production is centered on 1,000 barrels per day (160 m^{3}/d).
